The 6th Golden Horse Awards (Mandarin:第6屆金馬獎) took place on October 30, 1968, at Zhongshan Hall in Taipei, Taiwan.

Winners and nominees 
Winners are listed first, highlighted in boldface.

References

6th
1968 film awards
1968 in Taiwan